Mango is a comune (municipality) in the Province of Cuneo in the Italian region Piedmont, located about  southeast of Turin and about  northeast of Cuneo.

Mango borders the following municipalities: Camo, Castino, Coazzolo, Cossano Belbo, Neive, Neviglie, Rocchetta Belbo, Santo Stefano Belbo, and Trezzo Tinella.

References

Cities and towns in Piedmont